Corythoichthys amplexus, known commonly as the many-spotted pipefish  or yellow-spotted pipefish , is a species of marine fish in the family Syngnathidae.

The many-spotted pipefish  is widespread throughout the tropical waters of the central Indo-Pacific region, from Indonesia to the Philippines. It occurs mainly in shallow rubble lagoons among algae and seagrasses, it is frequently recorded in the intertidal zone, and is normally found in only a few metres depth. Like other pipefish this species is ovoviviparous and the male bears the fertilised eggs in a brood pouch located under his tail 

The many-spotted pipefish  is a small fish and can reach a maximum total length of  length.

References

External links
http://www.marinespecies.org/aphia.php?p=taxdetails&id=278447

polynotatus
Taxa named by Charles Eric Dawson
Fish described in 1977